Tatiana Karina Urrutia Herrera (born 17 September 1982) is a Chilean lawyer who was elected as a member of the Chilean Constitutional Convention.

References

External links
 
 BCN Profile

1982 births
Living people
21st-century Chilean lawyers
21st-century Chilean politicians
Democratic Revolution politicians
Members of the Chilean Constitutional Convention
21st-century Chilean women politicians